Murder Cove is located at the southernmost portion of Admiralty Island in the U.S. state of Alaska. The cove was home to the Tyee Company whaling station and was known for whaling operations from 1907 through 1913.

History

Name
The area was named Murder Cove after two gold prospectors were murdered in the area in 1869 as revenge for the killing of two Tlingit tribesmen. In retaliation the  destroyed three villages and two wooden forts near present-day Kake, Alaska. This unopposed destruction of villages and forts by the US Government became known as the Kake War.

Whaling

Commercial operations in fishing and sea hunting were established inside the bay at Point Gardner by the Tyee Company who sought to take advantage of the unexploited waters of southeast Alaska. They established their operations on Admiralty Island at Murder Cove in 1907 using the first American-built steam-powered whaler, the 97-foot "Tyee Junior", which was equipped with a harpoon gun on the bow. Consequent to a declining whale population, the company closed its operations in 1913.

Coal exploration
In 1905, the most extensive coal exploration in southeastern Alaska occurred at Murder Cove, Kootznahoo Inlet, and Hamilton Bay. The Tertiary-aged coal-bearing formations are made up of conglomerate, sandstone, and shale. Though this deposit contains the best grade of coal in the region, further development did not proceed because of its very limited size. A lighthouse was established at Murder Cover during the fiscal year 1914.

Geography

It forms a narrow inlet  in length. This bay forms a well-protected harbor for vessels of moderate size. At its rocky entrance is the Surprise Harbor, which provides safe anchorage and vistas of the area.

References
This article contains public domain text from A.C. Spencer's "The Juneau gold belt, Alaska: A reconnaissance of Admiralty Island, Alaska" (1906)

Coves of the United States
Bodies of water of Juneau, Alaska
Bays of Hoonah–Angoon Census Area, Alaska
Alexander Archipelago
Bays of Alaska